Izzy was the official mascot of the Atlanta 1996 Summer Olympics. Initially named Whatizit ("What is it?") at its introduction at the close of the 1992 Summer Olympics in Barcelona, the animated character with the ability to morph into different forms was a departure from the Olympic tradition in that it did not represent a nationally significant animal or human figure.

History

Conception and introduction at the 1992 Barcelona Olympics

In 1991, the Atlanta Committee for the Olympic Games (ACOG) began a search for a mascot with a competition of twenty design firms as well as suggestions from the general public. The selection, Whatizit, was designed by John Ryan, senior animation director of Atlanta-based design firm DESIGNefx.

Whatizit originally appeared as a blue, tear-shaped "blob" with rings around his eyes and tail.  He wore high-top sneakers and had star-shaped pupils.  His arms and legs were also short with a toothy grin showing both rows of teeth. He was later modified to have longer limbs to give a more athletic look.

In addition to renaming him "Izzy", several changes were made to the mascot's appearance including losing the bottom row of teeth, adding a nose, making the tongue visible, and making the limbs longer, skinnier, and more athletic.

Izzy's Quest for Olympic Gold 
ACOG commissioned an animated television special entitled "Izzy's Quest For Olympic Gold" to promote Izzy and expand his backstory. Produced by Film Roman, the special debuted on TNT on August 12, 1995. Long considered to be lost media, a VHS recording was discovered and uploaded to YouTube in December 2020.

Plot
A torchbearer runs through Olympia all the way to Atlanta to light the Olympic cauldron. The flame is revealed to contain an alternate universe known as the Torch World. Torch World, described as being above the stadium/games, depicts rolling hills, mountains, columns, and other terrain that appears similar to depictions of Ancient Greece. The Torch World citizens can be seen performing every day activities in an Olympic fashion, such as hanging clothing with a bow and arrow. 

As Izzy plays basketball in his bedroom, we see Izzy’s morphing powers as he turns into the ball, launching himself into the net., George (Izzy's father) scolds him by advising that Torch World citizens do not compete in the Olympic Games. Izzy brushes off his father and remarks to himself that he will try out for the games anyway. He eventually runs into Martin and Spartan, other Torch World creatures that challenge him to a race to the town center. Izzy sprints past them, exemplifying Olympic events such as racing, long jumping, and kayaking to save Spartan from drowning. 

Izzy makes his way to the Tribunal of Elders and is given thanks for saving Spartan, the son of one of the elders. Instead of a reward, Izzy asks if he can go down to Earth to try out for the Olympic Games. The elders inform him that the only way he can go down to Earth to compete is if he obtains the five Olympic rings, symbolizing Perseverance, Integrity, Sportsmanship, Excellence, and Brotherhood. Izzy announces confidently to the elders that he will accomplish this goal, and by doing so immediately earns the Ring of Perseverance. Izzy begins his quest. 

Izzy heads to the home of Koroibos, an experienced athlete who was at the very first Olympic games (Her name is a tribute to Koroibos, the first recorded winner of an Olympic game. Whether she competed or not is unknown.) to seek help on his quest. In discussing his favorite sports, Izzy turns into a soccer ball to which Koroibos tells Izzy that he has a gift. 

The next day, Izzy competes in a local cycling race against other Torch World citizens. Martin and Spartan interfere with Izzy as he is cycling and push him off the track. Despite this, Izzy finds himself on a shortcut and beats the other cyclists. He is awarded first place, but tells the judges that he cannot accept the award because he cheated. One of the judges thanks him for his honesty, and he is awarded the Ring of Integrity. The Tribunal of Elders have fear of Izzy earning all of the rings and take note of the moral divide between the Torch World citizens. The Elders decide to host their own Torch World games to determine if Izzy should continue to win the Rings. 

Starting off with the gymnastic rings, Spartan competes and earns high scores from the judges. Izzy performs after Spartan and earns higher scores, except for one score from Martin who is in disguise. Koroibos notices the unfair judgement, but Izzy, respects the judges call and says the judge must have seen something the others have not seen. Izzy earns the Ring of Sportsmanship for having dignity in his loss. 

In the next event, hurdles, Izzy beats Spartan despite Martin raising the height of the hurdles for Izzy. Izzy earns the ring of excellence after giving it his all. Animosity grows from the haters of Izzy, and the sky of Torch World becomes filled with dark clouds. Koroibos is at a loss of how to guide Izzy through this, as the final competition, a 1v1 basketball game, begins. Izzy cannot bring himself to compete against Spartan again after hearing the hate and sorrow from the crowd. He says, “No trip to the Games is worth this,”  and walks off the court. In his effort to bring peace, the Ring of Brotherhood appears above him. One of the Elders is reminded that the Olympics are meant to bring people of all walks of life together for the betterment of society. 

The storm clouds clear away, and the Elders announce that they have found a new spirit and understanding of the values of the Olympics. The Elders grant Izzy permission to try out for the Games on Earth, and the stadium rejoices. Martin and Spartan attempt to flee, but Spartan’s mother (one of the Elders) looks like she is about to scold the two. Izzy turns into a basketball out of pure joy, then hugs his parents and Koroibos.

Media ridicule
Despite continued efforts to evolve his look, Izzy proved very unpopular; a range of nicknames appeared in media outlets, such as "The Sperm in Sneakers." Busch Gardens Williamsburg, a theme park in Williamsburg, Virginia, named a new Wild Mouse roller coaster after the mascot, but the name has since been changed. A popular joke that circulated in Atlanta around the end of the 1996 games stated that the blue line painted on Peachtree Road (which actually designated the route for the Olympic Marathon) was "Izzy's ass being dragged out of town."

Izzy was referenced in "The Old Man and the 'C' Student", an episode of The Simpsons. It was not referred to as Izzy, though, rather being referred to as "the Atlanta Whatsit".

Video games
Izzy served as the player's character in a video game titled Izzy's Quest for the Olympic Rings, released in 1995 by U.S. Gold for the Super NES and Genesis platforms.  An adventure game entitled Izzy's Adventure was released for PC in 1996.

References

External links

 photograph of Izzy, on a mascot manufacturer website.
 A site devoted to Izzy pins.

1996 Summer Olympics
Mascots introduced in 1992
Fictional extraterrestrial characters
Fictional shapeshifters
Olympic mascots
Sports mascots in the United States
Fictional characters from Atlanta